Lenartowo (German 1939-1945 Lehenhard)  is a village in the administrative district of Gmina Jeziora Wielkie, within Mogilno County, Kuyavian-Pomeranian Voivodeship, in north-central Poland.

The village has a population of 140.

References

Lenartowo